Ascochyta spinaciae is a fungal plant pathogen that causes leaf spot of spinach.

See also
List of Ascochyta species

References

External links

spinaciae
Fungal plant pathogens and diseases
Eudicot diseases
Fungi described in 1923
Spinach